Whirling Peach Blossom ( 桃花旋转舞 ) is a work
for solo piano, composed by He Xuntian in 2015.

Summary
He Xuntian adopted RD Composition, SS Composition and Theory of Musical Dimension in his work Whirling Peach Blossom.

Inspiration
Whirling Peach Blossom was inspired from Xuntian He’s ideology:
"Whirling into the unborn and the undying".

References

External links
Whirling Peach Blossom published by Schott Musik International, Germany

Compositions for piano by He Xuntian
Compositions for solo piano
2015 compositions